Resurgence may refer to:
Resurgence (spring), spring discharge, where water comes from the ground
Resurgence (pest) of (usually agricultural)  pests, due for example, to the misuse of pesticides
Resurgence (Dutch Revolt), the period between 1572 and 1585 in the Dutch Revolt
Risorgimento, meaning the Resurgence, Italian unification
The Resurgence (organization), a Christian ministry associated with Mars Hill Church and Mark Driscollbmkl

Media
Resurgence!, a 1981 album by jazz saxophonist David "Fathead" Newman
Resurgence (magazine), a British publication, merged with The Ecologist in 2012
Resurgence (novel), a 2002 novel by Charles Sheffield
Resurgence (C. J. Cherryh novel), a 2020 novel by C. J. Cherryh
Anti-Semitism in the 21st Century: The Resurgence, 2007 documentary film
 Independence Day: Resurgence, 2016 American film